Handelsdepartementet may refer to:

Ministry of Trade and Industry (Norway), a former ministry in Norway
Ministry of Commerce and Industry (Sweden), a former ministry in Sweden